Setsoto Local Municipality is an administrative area in the Thabo Mofutsanyane District of the Free State in South Africa. The name is a Sesotho word meaning "beauty". Setsoto is headed by Ficksburg, followed by Senekal, Clocolan and Marquard.  It is the getaway municipality to the Kingdom of Lesotho through Ficksburg.  Setsoto is rich in agriculture as well as producing cherries.

The first mayor was Ms M.Molete and the current is Ms Seipati Mbiwe.

Main places
The 2011 census divided the municipality into the following main places:

Politics 

The municipal council consists of thirty-three members elected by mixed-member proportional representation. Seventeen councillors are elected by first-past-the-post voting in seventeen wards, while the remaining sixteen are chosen from party lists so that the total number of party representatives is proportional to the number of votes received. In the election of 1 November 2021 the African National Congress (ANC) won a majority of seventeen seats on the council.
The following table shows the results of the election.

References

External links
 http://www.setsoto.info/

 
Local municipalities of the Thabo Mofutsanyane District Municipality